Two knights may refer to:
 Two Knights Defense - chess opening
 Two knights endgame - chess endgame
 Two Knights from Brooklyn - 1949 film
 Two Arabian Knights - 1927 film
 Two Nights with Cleopatra - 1953 film
 Two for the Knight - 2002 concert by Brian McKnight and Regine Velasquez